TK may refer to:

People
Tony Kanaan (born 1974), Brazilian racing driver
Tony Khan (born 1982), American businessman
Theodore K. Lawless (1892–1971), American dermatologist and philanthropist
T. K. Oommen (born 1937), Indian sociologist, author, and professor

Places
 Tehsil or taluk, an administrative division in several South Asian countries
 Tokelau (ISO 3166-1 country code)
 TK (South Korea) (Taegu–Kyŏngbuk), two administrative regions

Arts and media

Music
 TK (Peruvian rock band)
 TK Records, a record label
 Tetsuya Komuro (born 1958), also known as TK, Japanese musician and producer
 Toru Kitajima (born 1982), also known as TK from Ling Tosite Sigure, Japanese musician

Television
 Takeru "T.K." Takaishi, a character from Digimon anime
 TK, a character in Angel Beats!

Other media
 TK, a identification prefix for Imperial stormtroopers in the classic era of the Star Wars universe
 TK, the protagonist of the game Driver: Parallel Lines
 "Tk'tk'tk", a science-fiction short story by David D. Levine
 Tidens Krav, a newspaper published in Kristiansund, Norway
 Tom Kent (active 1970s–2000s), American radio DJ

Businesses
 ThyssenKrupp, a German industrial conglomerate
 Turkish Airlines (IATA code TK)
 TK Maxx, the European arm of TJ Maxx

Science and technology
 .tk, the Internet top-level domain for Tokelau
 Tk (software), a GUI toolkit
 Telecine, a process of transferring motion picture film to video
 Thymidine kinase, a protein
 Transketolase, an enzyme in the pentose phosphate pathway and in the Calvin cycle
 Type 94 tankette, a vehicle of the Imperial Japanese Army
 Korovin pistol, a Russian semi-automatic pistol

Other uses
 Bangladeshi taka, a currency
 Telekinesis, an alleged psychic ability
 To come (publishing), commonly abbreviated as "TK"
 Traditional knowledge
 Turkmen language (ISO 639-1 language code)
 Transitional kindergarten, part of the California public school system
 , Postal codes in Greece

See also

 
 KT (disambiguation)
 T (disambiguation)
 K (disambiguation)
 TKS (disambiguation)